Cyperus tonkinensis is a species of sedge that is endemic to parts of western Africa and eastern Asia.

The species was first formally described by the botanist Charles Baron Clarke in 1908.

See also
 List of Cyperus species

References

tonkinensis
Taxa named by Charles Baron Clarke
Plants described in 1908
Flora of Thailand
Flora of Vietnam
Flora of Laos
Flora of Sierra Leone
Flora of Senegal
Flora of Nigeria
Flora of Liberia
Flora of Mali
Flora of Benin
Flora of Chad
Flora of the Central African Republic
Flora of the Democratic Republic of the Congo
Flora of Ivory Coast
Flora of Guinea
Flora of Ghana